The Men's team sprint at the 2014 Commonwealth Games, was part of the cycling programme, which took place on 24 July 2014.

Qualification

Finals

Gold medal match

Bronze medal match

References

Men's team sprint
Cycling at the Commonwealth Games – Men's team sprint